Jubata ez-Zeit (Jubātā az-Zayt) was a Syrian village situated in the far north of the Golan Heights. According to an Arab resident of a nearby town, it had a population of around 1,500 to 2,000 people prior to the forced expulsion of the town's residents in 1968.

Etymology
Jubata ez-Zeit is an Arabic name that translates into English as "olive oil pit," and refers to the olive trees that grew in the village which remain present today.

History

19th century
In 1810, Johann Ludwig Burckhardt visited the village and wrote:

"... One hour more brought us to the village of Djoubeta, where we remained during the night at the house of some friends of the Sheikh of Banias. This village belongs to Hasbeya; it is inhabited by about fifty Turkish and ten Greek families; they subsist chiefly by the cultivation of olives, and by the rearing of cattle. I was well treated at the house where we alighted, and also at that of the Sheikh of the village, where I went to drink a cup of coffee. It being Ramadan, we passed the greater part of the night in conversation and smoking; the company grew merry, and knowing that I was curious about ruined places, began to enumerate all the villages and ruins in the neighbourhood, of which I subjoin the names.* The neighbouring mountains of the Heish abound in tigers (نمورة nimoura); their skins are much esteemed by the Arab Sheikhs as saddle cloths. There are also bears, wolves, and stags; the wild boar is met with in all the mountains which I visited in my tour."

1967 and aftermath
About half of the residents of Jubat ez-Zeit fled during the fighting in the Six-Day War of June 1967. The remaining half were expelled from the Golan Heights by the Israeli Army after the war, and the village was razed. One year after the war, in 1968, the area was declared a closed military zone.

In the early 1970s, the Israeli settlement of Neve Ativ was built on the site of the former village.

Geography
Jubata ez-Zeit was located in the lower, eastern ridges of Jabal esh-Sheikh. Wadi Jubbata passes below it, and runs to the north of Nimrod castle toward Banias.

Notable residents
Marwan Habash (born 1938), Syrian Baath Party politician and writer

See also
 Syrian towns and villages depopulated in the Arab-Israeli conflict

References

Bibliography

   (p. 641)

External links
Settlements and cult sites on Mount Hermon, Israel: Ituraean culture in the Hellenistic and Roman periods

Further reading
Ray Murphy: Forgotten Rights: Consequences of the Israeli occupation of the Golan Heights. in David Keane and Yvonne McDermott (eds.): The Challenge of Human Rights: Past, Present and Future. Edward Elgar, Cheltenham and Northampton 2012, pp. 138–163. Article focusses on Jubata ez-Zeit.

Destroyed towns
Former populated places on the Golan Heights